The 1938 West Derbyshire by-election was held on 2 June 1938.  The by-election was held due to the succession to the peerage of the incumbent Conservative MP, Edward Cavendish.  It was won by the Conservative candidate Henry Hunloke.

References

1938 elections in the United Kingdom
1938 in England
1930s in Derbyshire
By-elections to the Parliament of the United Kingdom in Derbyshire constituencies